Jake David Charles (born 16 February 1996) is a professional footballer who plays as a striker or winger for Scarborough Athletic. Born in England, he has represented Wales  at youth international level.

Club career

Huddersfield Town
Charles was born in Mirfield, West Yorkshire. He began to play football when he was three and joined Battyeford Juniors and Garforth Villa's youth academy before joining Huddersfield Town's U11 side when he was 10.

Having progressed through the academy, Charles signed his first professional contract with the club on 28 February 2013 and started his first years scholars. With his contract set to expire at the end of the 2013–14 season, Charles signed a contract extension, keeping him until 2017. Throughout 2013–14, Charles was honoured by the League Football Education and was nominated for the League Football Education's Championship Apprentice of the Year, but lost out to Mason Bennett of Derby County.

After appearing as unused substitute against Norwich City on 17 March 2015 for the first time, Charles made his first-team debut for Huddersfield Town as an 87th-minute substitute in a 2–0 Championship defeat by Fulham. Later in the 2014–15 season Charles scored twice for the Huddersfield Town under-21 team as they beat Crystal Palace under-21s to seal a place in the Professional Development League 2 play-off Final.

On 31 July 2015, he joined National League club Guiseley on a one-month loan until 29 August 2015 but he did not make any appearances for the club during this spell.

Barnsley
On 1 September 2016, Charles signed for fellow Championship club Barnsley on a contract until the end of 2016–17. On 25 November 2016, he joined National League club York City on loan until 1 January 2017. Charles was released by Barnsley at the end of 2016–17.

Stalybridge Celtic
Charles signed for Northern Premier League Premier Division club Stalybridge Celtic on 28 July 2017. He made 45 appearances in all competitions, scoring 12 goals, as Stalybridge finished in 22nd place in the table. He left the club at the end of 2017–18.

Stafford Rangers
In October 2018, Charles joined Northern Premier League side Stafford Rangers and scored on his debut.

Farsley Celtic
On 29 May 2020 National League North club Farsley Celtic announced they had signed Charles.

In June 2021, Charles returned to Stafford Rangers. He finished the season with nine goals in 39 appearances in all competitions.

In May 2022, it was announced that Charles had joined Scarborough Athletic following their promotion to National League North.

International career
Charles has represented Wales at under-16, under-17 and under-19 and under-21 levels. After making his debut for the Wales under-17 side, Charles became the fourth member of his family to play for the country after his grandfather, his great-uncle Mel and his cousin Jeremy. He was capped three times by the under-17s in 2012, before appearing three times for the under-19s in 2014.

Charles was called up to the Wales under-21 squad for their 2017 UEFA European Under-21 Championship match against Bulgaria on 31 March 2015. He made his debut on 4 September as an 81st-minute substitute in a 3–1 away won over Luxembourg in 2017 UEFA European Under-21 Championship qualifying. He finished his under-21 career with nine appearances from 2015 to 2016.

Style of play
A versatile forward, Charles can play both as a striker or as a winger.

Personal life
Charles is the grandson of Wales international player John Charles. While growing up, Jake Charles attended Ninelands Primary School and Garforth Academy.

Career statistics

References

External links

1996 births
Living people
People from Mirfield
People educated at Garforth Academy
Footballers from West Yorkshire
English footballers
Welsh footballers
Association football wingers
Association football forwards
Wales youth international footballers
Wales under-21 international footballers
Huddersfield Town A.F.C. players
Guiseley A.F.C. players
Barnsley F.C. players
York City F.C. players
Stalybridge Celtic F.C. players
Stafford Rangers F.C. players
Farsley Celtic A.F.C. players
English Football League players
National League (English football) players
Northern Premier League players